= Innocent Muhizi =

Rwandan diplomat

Innocent Muhizi is a Rwandan diplomat. He was appointed as High Commissioner to Singapore in July 2025 and presented his letter of credence on 17 November. Additionally he became High Commissioner to New Zealand on 1 April 2026.
